The Secret of Blood is a 1953 Czechoslovak biographical drama film directed by Martin Frič about Czech doctor Jan Janský who discovered and classified the four different blood types. It competed at 14th Venice International Film Festival.

Cast
 Vladimír Ráž as Dr. Jan Janský
 Zdeněk Štěpánek as Prof. Kuffner
 Jiřina Petrovická as Hedva
 Vlastimil Brodský as Dr. Kozdera
 Svatopluk Beneš as Dr. Regent
 Rudolf Hrušínský as Dr. Kurzweil
 Radovan Lukavský as Worker Kolčava
 Vlasta Chramostová as Kolčavová
 Rudolf Deyl as Batman Papík
 Josef Hlinomaz as Alois
 František Filipovský as Doctor at Lecture
 Josef Kemr as Angry patient
 Gustav Hilmar as Prof. Kyselka

References

External links
 

1953 films
Czechoslovak drama films
1950s Czech-language films
1953 drama films
Films directed by Martin Frič
Czech biographical drama films
1950s biographical drama films
1950s Czech films